Baban-e Sardar Qasemkhan (also Romanized as Bābān-e Sardār Qāsemkhān; also known as Bābān Yāvar and Bāvān) is a village in Sanjabi Rural District, Kuzaran District, Kermanshah County, Kermanshah Province, Iran. At the 2006 census, its population was 320, in 65 families.

References 

Populated places in Kermanshah County